The Maroubra Lions is a community rugby league football club located in Maroubra, in the Eastern Suburbs of Sydney, Australia. It is part of Souths Juniors and competes in the mini, mod and A-Grade competitions. The club's colors are like the South Sydney Rabbitohs but without the black and white stripes. Their main rivals are the Eastern Suburbs RLFC club.

Premierships
Maroubra's A grade side won premierships in: 1979
Maroubra's Reserve grade side won premierships in: 
Maroubra's Under 18's side won premierships in:

Notable Juniors
Notable First Grade Players that have played at Maroubra Lions include:
Willie Peters (1997-04 South Sydney Rabbitohs, St George, Wigan)
Craig Wing (1998-09 South Sydney Rabbitohs & Sydney)
Braith Anasta (2000-14 Canterbury Bulldogs, Sydney & West Tigers)
Reni Maitua (2004-14 Canterbury Bulldogs, Cronulla & Parramatta Eels)
Kane Morgan (2011- South Sydney Rabbitohs
Campbell Graham (2017- South Sydney Rabbitohs)
Peter Mamouzelos (2021- South Sydney Rabbitohs)
Matt Thistlethwaite

Notable Coaches
Cem Onur - U13s, U14s, U15s undefeated premiership winners

See also

References

External links
Maroubra Lions
sportingpulse

Rugby league teams in Sydney
Rugby clubs established in 1952
1952 establishments in Australia
Maroubra, New South Wales